In mathematical logic, a ground term of a formal system is a term that does not contain any variables. Similarly, a ground formula is a formula that does not contain any variables.

A ground expression is a ground term or ground formula.

Examples

  are ground terms;
  are ground terms;
  are ground terms;

Formal definitions

What follows is a formal definition for first-order languages. Let a first-order language be given, with  the set of constant symbols,  the set of functional operators, and  the set of predicate symbols.

Ground term

A  is a term that contains no variables. Ground terms may be defined by logical recursion (formula-recursion):
 Every ground term can be given by a finite application of the above two rules (there are no other ground terms; in particular, predicates cannot be ground terms).

Roughly speaking, the Herbrand universe is the set of all ground terms.

Ground atom

Roughly speaking, the Herbrand base is the set of all ground atoms, while a Herbrand interpretation assigns a truth value to each ground atom in the base.

Ground formula

Ground formulas may be defined by syntactic recursion as follows:
 A ground atom is a ground formula.

Ground formulas are a particular kind of closed formulas.

See also

References

 
 
 First-Order Logic: Syntax and Semantics

Logical expressions
Mathematical logic